SMS Breslau was a  of the Imperial German Navy, built in the early 1910s and named after the Lower Silesian city of Breslau. Following her commissioning, Breslau and the battlecruiser  were assigned to the Mittelmeerdivision (Mediterranean Division) in response to the Balkan Wars. After evading British warships in the Mediterranean to reach Constantinople, Breslau and Goeben were transferred to the Ottoman Empire in August 1914, to entice the Ottomans to join the Central Powers in World War I. The two ships, along with several other Ottoman vessels, raided Russian ports in October 1914, prompting a Russian declaration of war. The ships were renamed Midilli and Yavûz Sultân Selîm, respectively, and saw extensive service with the Ottoman fleet, primarily in the Black Sea against the Russian Black Sea Fleet.

Midilli was active in laying minefields off the Russian coast, bombarding Russian ports and installations and, because of a shortage of Ottoman merchant ships, transporting troops and supplies to the Black Sea ports supplying Ottoman troops fighting in the Caucasus Campaign. She was lightly damaged several times by Russian ships, but the most serious damage was inflicted by a mine in 1915, which kept her out of service for half of a year. The ship was sunk by mines in January 1918 during the Battle of Imbros, with the loss of the vast majority of her crew.

Design

Her propulsion system consisted of two sets of AEG-Vulcan steam turbines driving four   propellers. They were designed to give , but reached  in service. These were powered by sixteen coal-fired Marine-type water-tube boilers, although they were later altered to use fuel oil that was sprayed on the coal to increase its burn rate. Breslau had a crew of 18 officers and 336 enlisted men.

The ship was armed with a main battery of twelve  SK L/45 guns in single pedestal mounts. Two were placed side by side forward on the forecastle, eight were located amidships, four on either side, and two were side by side aft. They were supplied with 1,800 rounds of ammunition, for 150 shells per gun. By 1917, the 10.5 cm guns were replaced with eight  SK L/45 guns, one fore and aft and three on each broadside. She was also equipped with a pair of  torpedo tubes with five torpedoes; the tubes were submerged in the hull on the broadside. She could also carry 120 mines.

Service history

Breslau was ordered under the contract name "Ersatz " and was laid down at the AG Vulcan shipyard in Stettin in 1910. At her launching ceremony on 16 May 1911, she was christened by the mayor of Breslau, the ship's namesake. After her launching, fitting-out work commenced and lasted until mid-1912. She was commissioned into the High Seas Fleet on 20 August 1912.

Following her commissioning, Breslau was attached to the German Mittelmeerdivision (Mediterranean Division) along with the battlecruiser  under the command of Rear Admiral Wilhelm Souchon. The German Navy decided it needed a permanent naval presence in the Mediterranean in the aftermath of the Balkan Wars that began in 1912. Karl Dönitz, the future Grand Admiral during World War II, served aboard Breslau from 1912 to 1916.

World War I
At the outbreak of World War I, Breslau and Goeben were to interdict French transports transferring troops from Algeria to France. On 3 August 1914, Souchon's two ships were steaming off Algeria; shortly after 06:00, Breslau bombarded the embarkation port of Bône while Goeben attacked Philippeville. The attacks caused minimal damage, however, and Souchon quickly broke off and returned to Messina to replenish his coal stocks. Although the British were not yet at war with Germany, the two British battlecruisers  and  shadowed the German ships while en route to Messina. After partially replenishing Goebens coal on the 5th, Souchon arranged to meet a collier in the Aegean. Goeben and Breslau left port the following morning bound for Constantinople, pursued by the British Mediterranean Fleet. That evening, the 1st Cruiser Squadron, commanded by Rear Admiral Ernest Troubridge, intercepted the Germans; Breslau briefly exchanged fire with the light cruiser  before Troubridge broke off the attack, fearing Goebens powerful  guns.

On 8 August, Goeben and Breslau met the collier off the island of Donoussa near Naxos, and two days later they entered the Dardanelles. To circumvent neutrality requirements, Germany transferred the two ships to the Ottoman Navy on 16 August, though the supposed sale was simply a ruse. On 23 September, Souchon accepted an offer to command the Turkish fleet. Breslau was renamed Midilli while Goeben was renamed Yavûz Sultân Selîm; their German crews remained with the ships and donned Ottoman uniforms and fezzes. The British did not accept the sale of the ships to the Ottoman Empire and stationed a blockading force outside the Dardanelles with orders to attack the ships if they appeared, regardless of the flag they flew.

Ottoman service

1914
On the evening of 27 October 1914, Midilli and the rest of the Ottoman fleet left the Bosporus and steamed into the Black Sea, ostensibly to conduct maneuvers. Instead, the fleet split into four groups to attack Russian bases on the other side of the Black Sea; Midilli and another cruiser were tasked with mining the Strait of Kerch and then attacking the port of Novorossisk. Midilli laid sixty mines in the Strait, which later claimed two Russian merchant ships, and then joined the other ship in bombarding Novorossisk. Although the damage inflicted on the Russians was relatively light, it forced the Russians to declare war on the Ottoman Empire, bringing the country into the war on the side of Germany.

In early November 1914, while Midilli was operating in the eastern Black Sea and covering Ottoman transports, she was detached to shell the Russian port of Poti in retaliation for Russian attacks on Turkish shipping. On 17 November, she sortied with Yavûz Sultân Selîm, under the command of Souchon, in an attempt to intercept the Black Sea Fleet as it returned from bombarding Trebizond. Midilli discovered the Russian ships off Cape Sarych, the southern tip of the Crimea in poor visibility at short range. In the resulting engagement, Souchon ordered Midilli to assume a safer position to Yavûzs rear, but she was engaged by the pre-dreadnoughts  and  without effect before Souchon ordered the Turkish ships to disengage shortly afterward. The cruiser spent the rest of the month escorting shipping to Trebizond. On 5 December, she escorted a small raiding party to Akkerman, Bessarabia, that was intended to attack railroad installations. On the return voyage, Midilli bombarded Sevastopol, damaging some minesweepers at anchor.

A month later, on 23 December, Midilli sortied to rendezvous with Yavûz Sultân Selîm off Sinope, and in the darkness the following morning she encountered the Russian transport Oleg, which was intended to be sunk as a blockship in Zonguldak. Midilli quickly sank Oleg but was forced to turn away after spotting Rostislav. She then encountered another blockship, Athos, and forced her crew to scuttle the ship. She then briefly engaged Russian destroyers before moving ahead of the Russian fleet to monitor their progress. Ottoman coastal guns forced the remaining blockships to scuttle in deep water.

1915

Midilli conducted a series of sorties against the Russians in early 1915, including an operation in concert with the cruiser  in January, during which they inadvertently came into contact with the Black Sea Fleet. Midilli scored a hit on the battleship s main battery turret before the Ottoman ships withdrew.

On 3 April, the Ottoman fleet sortied to attack Russian transports off Odessa. Midilli and Yavûz Sultân Selîm provided the covering force for the attack, which failed after the cruiser  struck a mine and sank off Odessa. The Russian fleet attempted to intercept the Turkish force, but Midilli and Yavûz Sultân Selîm were able to escape undamaged. The two ships, joined by Hamidiye, conducted a sweep to attack Russian transports on 6 May, but found no targets. Later that month, detachments of naval infantry from Midilli and Yavûz Sultân Selîm were landed to assist in the defense against the Allied landings at Gallipoli. In a brief firefight, the cruiser crippled Gnevny with a hit in her starboard engine compartment that broke the main steam line to the engines, but was forced to turn away when Gnevny fired five torpedoes at her. Midilli was hit seven times herself with only slight damage and Gnevny was towed back to Sevastopol the following day by Derzki.

Midilli struck a mine on 18 July as she sailed from Constantinople to escort a merchant ship through the minefields defending the capital. The ship made it to port at İstinye and an inspection revealed that she was not badly damaged. Hampered by a shortage of trained personnel and material, however, the ship's repairs took quite a long time.

1916
The ship did not return to service until February 1916, and the opportunity was taken to replace two of her 10.5 cm guns with 15 cm pieces. On 27 February, she was used to quickly transport 71 officers and men of a machine-gun company and a significant stock of supplies and munitions to Trebizond, which was then under heavy pressure from the Russian army. Midilli evaded the Russians and reached Trebizond. On 2 March, she attempted to attack a pair of destroyers north of Zonguldak, but she was unable to catch them. The ship then returned to the Bosporus. On 11 March, Midilli made another run, this time carrying 211 soldiers and twelve barrels of fuel and lubricating oil, which were successfully landed on the 13th. She then stopped in Samsun, where she picked up  of flour, one ton of maize, and 30 tons of coal, before returning to the Bosporus.

A third supply operation followed on 3 April, when the ship brought 107 men, 5,000 rifles, and 794 cases of ammunition to Trebizond. After making the delivery, the ship met the U-boat  and proceeded to attack Russian forces. Midilli shelled Russian positions at Sürmene Bay, where she set the minesweeper T.233 on fire, which was then destroyed by U-33s deck gun. Midilli then turned north and sank a Russian sailing vessel off Tuapse before running into the powerful dreadnought battleship . Midilli fled at high speed after being straddled several times, though she was not damaged. In early May, the cruiser laid two minefields, each of 60 mines. The first of these was laid off the Chilia branch of the Danube River and the other off Cape Tarkhankut in the Crimea. On the second trip she bombarded Yevpatoria after laying her mines. Midilli transported more troops to Sinope and Samsun on 30 May, returning with grain and tobacco as deck cargo.

Midilli sank a pair of Russian ships off Sochi on 4 July and destroyed another that had been torpedoed the previous day. She then rejoined Yavûz Sultân Selîm for the return to the Bosporus, during which the two ships evaded strong Russian forces attempting to intercept them. Later that month, on 21 July, Midilli attempted to lay a minefield off Novorossisk, but Russian wireless interception allowed the dreadnought  and several destroyers to leave port and attempt to cut Midilli off from the Bosporus. The two ships encountered each other at 13:05, and Midilli quickly turned back south. Her stern 15 cm gun kept Russian destroyers at bay, but the ship only slowly drew out of range of Imperatritsa Mariyas heavy guns. Several near misses rained shell splinters on the deck and wounded several men. Heavy use of smoke screens and a rain squall allowed Midilli to break contact with her Russian pursuers, and she reached the Bosporus early the following morning. By the end of 1916, a severe coal shortage prevented Midilli and Yavûz Sultân Selîm from conducting offensive operations.

1917–1918

In May 1917, Midilli laid a minefield off the mouth of the Danube; while there, she destroyed the wireless station on Fidonisi Island and captured 11 prisoners. The minefield she laid later sank the destroyer  on 30 June. While Midilli was at sea, a Russian force including Imperatritsa Ekaterina Velikaya, which had by then been renamed ,  raided the Bosporus. Returning to port, Midilli was spotted by the Russian fleet, which attempted to cut her off from the safety of the Bosporus. Midilli raced toward port, while salvos from Svobodnaya Rossiya fell around her. The destroyer Gnevny closed to attack, but Midillis 15 cm guns drove her off. The cruiser managed to reach port without damage; this was the last engagement of the war between the former German warships and the Russian fleet. On 1 November, Midilli left the Bosporus to conduct a sweep for Russian warships. The Russians observed the departure and attempted to attack the cruiser with Svobodnaya Rossiya and the new battleship , but mutiny aboard Svobodnaya Rossiya prevented the force from intercepting Midilli before she slipped back into port that night.

On 20 January 1918, Midilli and Yavûz Sultân Selîm left the Dardanelles under the command of Vice Admiral Hubert von Rebeur-Paschwitz, who had replaced Souchon the previous September. Rebeur-Paschwitz's intention was to draw Allied naval forces away from Palestine in support of Turkish forces there. Rebeur-Paschwitz then decided to proceed to the port of Mudros; there the British pre-dreadnought battleship  was raising steam to attack the Turkish ships. While en route to Mudros Midilli struck a total of five mines and sank; Yavûz hit three mines as well and was forced to beach to avoid sinking. Three hundred and thirty of Midillis crew were killed in her sinking, 162 survivors were rescued by British destroyers. According to Hildebrand, Röhr, and Steinmetz, only 133 men were rescued from the ship.

Notes

Footnotes

Citations

References

Further reading
 
 

Magdeburg-class cruisers
Ships built in Bremen (state)
1911 ships
World War I cruisers of Germany
Midilli
World War I cruisers of the Ottoman Empire
Ships sunk by mines
Maritime incidents in 1918
World War I shipwrecks in the Aegean Sea
Shipwrecks of Turkey